TUDN (pronounced tu-de-ene; formerly called Univision Deportes Network (abbr. UDN) is an American Spanish language sports channel. Owned by TelevisaUnivision, it is an extension of the company's sports division of the same name. It launched on April 7, 2012, along with Univision Tlnovelas and FOROtv.

The network's main properties include major soccer events in the Americas, including per-team coverage of Liga MX, the Copa América, and CONCACAF's Champions League and Gold Cup events. In 2018-19, it also became the Spanish rightsholder of the UEFA Champions League. The channel has ties with the Mexican sports channel of the same name, sharing some of its programming. In 2019, it was announced that TDN and UDN would jointly relaunch as TUDN—signifying a greater amount of collaboration between the two channels.

As of February 2015, approximately 39.7 million households (34.1% of those with television) receive the channel. Univision stated per Nielsen ratings that TUDN was the sixth-highest rated U.S. sports channel in 2019 in terms of average primetime viewership.

History

In May 2011, Univision Communications announced three new cable television channels to strengthen its position in the Latino market and diversify revenues, including one dedicated to soccer and other sports. It signed a deal with the Dish Network in January 2012 to carry the channels via satellite. The channel dedicated to sports was named Univision Deportes Network. On May 11, 2012, AT&T U-verse signed a carriage agreement with Univision Communications to carry the channel, along with Univision Tlnovelas.

The channel had an output agreement to carry selected programming from Televisa Deportes Network (TDN); the network was branded as Univision TDN during these programs.

At launch, it offered a secondary network known as Univision Deportes Network Dos airing repeats of matches and studio programming, which was exclusively carried by Dish, but is currently defunct.

In May 2019, it was announced that both Televisa Deportes Network and Univision Deportes Network would be jointly rebranded as TUDN. Univision Deportes Network officially rebranded as TUDN on July 20, 2019. The new branding is an abbreviation of both names ("Televisa Univision Deportes Network"), but the first two letters are also pronounced as the Spanish adjective "tu" (your), allowing the name to also be read as "Tu Deportes Network" ("Your sports network").

TUDN is a multi-platform brand, and has a closer collaboration between the American and Mexican channels, allowing for expanded studio programming in the morning and daytime hours (to bolster its expansion into European soccer with its recent acquisition of UEFA rights, and existing content such as Liga MX soccer).

In 2022, TUDN launched a sister channel on the Vix streaming app, Zona TUDN.

Programming

The network's signature program is Univision Deportes Fútbol Club, an hour-long sports update show hosted by Xavi Sol (as of late 2017) alongside Félix Fernández and Hristo Stoichkov. There was a late-night version of the program hosted by Alejandro Berry, son of former news and sports anchor Jorge Berry, with various rotating analysts. The two editions of Fútbol Club differed by tone and style, with the early evening version being more lighthearted and comedic, while the late night version consisted of a round table discussion regarding the day's action (similar in format to ESPN's Around the Horn). The latter version was later renamed "Linea de Cuatro".

TUDN broadcasts home games for 16 of 18 teams in the Liga MX, away matches for the rest of the teams and playoff games. The weekly Saturday night program – Fútbol Central hosted by Edgar Martinez – features football highlights and previews matches from the Mexican league. Other competitions covered include the CONCACAF Champions League and Major League Soccer. Rights to MLS games in 2012 are shared with sister networks Galavision and UniMás.

In January 2016, Univision acquired Spanish-language rights to UEFA tournaments beginning in 2018, including UEFA Euro 2020 and the UEFA Nations League, with the channel planned to be involved in coverage. In 2017, Univision acquired Spanish-language rights to the UEFA Champions League and Europa League beginning in 2018-19.

In 2013, it acquired the U.S. Spanish-language rights to Formula One. However, ESPN Deportes acquired Formula One rights starting in 2020.

Play-by-play announcers

Emilio Fernando Alonso (Soccer)
Enrique Bermudez (Soccer)
José Hernandez (Soccer)
José Luis Lopez Salido (Soccer)
Ramses Sandoval (Soccer)
Luis Omar Tapia (Soccer)
Andrés Vaca (Soccer)
Paco Villa (Soccer)
Ricardo Celis (Mixed Martial Arts)

Sporting Events

Soccer
CONCACAF:
 CONCACAF Champions League
 CONCACAF Gold Cup
 CONCACAF Nations League
 CONCACAF Under-17 Championship 
 CONCACAF Under-20 Championship
 Leagues Cup

CONMEBOL:
Copa América (2021)
Copa América Femenina (2022)
CONMEBOL Pre-Olympic Tournament

:
 Campeón de Campeones
 Copa MX
 Liga MX
América
 Atlas
 Cruz Azul
 León
 Mazatlán
 Necaxa
 Pachuca
 Puebla
 Querétaro
 San Luis
 Toluca
 UANL
 UNAM
 Mexico national football team
 Supercopa MX
 Liga MX Femenil
Club América
 Cruz Azul
 Necaxa
 Toluca
 Tigres UANL
 Pumas UNAM

 UEFA (2018-2024):
 UEFA Euro 2024
 European Qualifiers
 UEFA Champions League 
 UEFA Europa League 
 UEFA Super Cup 
 UEFA Nations League

Martial arts
 Combate Americas

Professional wrestling
 CMLL Super Viernes

Former programming

American Football

Soccer
 FIFA tournaments
:
 Ligue 1
:
 Liga MX: Guadalajara, Monterrey, Juárez, Tijuana and Veracruz home matches
:
 Eredivisie
:
 Primeira Liga

: 
 MLS
 MLS All-Star Game
 United States men's national soccer team
 United States women's national soccer team

 
 Bundesliga

Motorsports 
 Formula One 
 Formula Two
 Formula Three

Controversies

Carriage disputes
Univision Deportes Network, Univision, UniMás, Galavisión and Univision Tlnovelas were dropped by AT&T U-verse on March 4, 2016, due to a carriage dispute. This did not affect DirecTV Customers (although being a subsidiary of U-Verse's parent company, AT&T), as this was done in a different contract. All of Univision's channels were returned to the U-verse lineup on March 24, 2016.

See also
TUDN Radio
Televisa Deportes Network

References

External links

Television channels and stations established in 2012
Spanish-language television networks in the United States
Soccer on United States television
Univision